The Rural Municipality of Edenwold No. 158 is a rural municipality (RM) in the Canadian province of Saskatchewan within Census Division No. 6 and  Division No. 2. It is located in the southeast portion of the portion of the province, east of the City of Regina.

History 
Indigenous peoples of the prairies inhabited the area for many years before any European settlement. Aboriginal people, who camped near Boggy Creek, used the Butte in Pilot Butte as a lookout and signal point.

European settlement in the area can be traced back to the 1840s. With the construction of the railway through the region in 1882, the towns of Pilot Butte and Balgonie were founded. In the following years, settlers began farming in the district and the two towns developed.

The RM of Edenwold No. 158 incorporated as a rural municipality on December 9, 1912.

In the late 1950s, the Trans-Canada Highway was completed and living outside of Regina began to become a popular option for those who wanted to commute to work in the city. Since then, the RM has seen significant population growth.

Geography 
In this area, the loggerhead shrike (Lanius ludovicianus excubitorides) and Sprague's pipit (Anthus spragueii) are both threatened species that are being monitored by conservationists.

Climate 
The RM of Edenwold experiences a dry humid continental climate (Köppen: Dfb) in the NRC Plant Hardiness Zone 3b. The RM of Edenwold has warm summers and cold, dry winters, prone to extremes at all times of the year. Precipitation is heaviest from June through August in the form of rain, while snow is common in the winter.

 Communities and localities 
In addition to the following list, the RM also neighbours six First Nations and six other RMs.

Urban municipalities
The following urban municipalities are surrounded by the RM.

Town of Balgonie
Town of  Pilot Butte
Town of White City
Village of Edenwold

Organized hamlets
The following organized hamlets are within the RM.

Crawford Estates

Localities
The following localities are also within the RM.
Coppersands
Dreghorn
Emerald Park
Franksburg
Frankslake
Jameson
Kathrintal Colony
Milaty
Poplar Park
Richardson
Seitzville
Zehner

Demographics 

The RM of Edenwold No. 158 is the second largest rural municipality by population in Saskatchewan and is the 19th largest municipality in the province overall.

Government 
The RM of Edenwold No. 158 is governed by an elected municipal council and an appointed administrator that meets on the second and fourth Tuesday of every month. The reeve of the RM is Mitchell Huber while its administrator is Kim McIvor. The RM's office is located in Emerald Park.

Municipal district planning 
In 2020, the Village of Edenwold and the RM initiated a process to establish Saskatchewan's first municipal district. Not specifically urban nor rural, a municipal district is a municipality that combines both types of municipalities, similar to specialized municipalities in Alberta such as Strathcona County or the Regional Municipality of Wood Buffalo. Public engagement of residents in both affected municipalities occurred in September 2021, which was followed by a survey in late November/early December. An open house is planned for January 2022. If an application to amalgamate the two municipalities is approved, the proposed name of the municipality is the Municipal District of Edenwold.

References 

E

Division No. 6, Saskatchewan